Simcoe (also spelled Simco) is an unincorporated community in northeastern McDonald County, in the U.S. state of Missouri. Simcoe is located along Missouri Route 76 between Longview and Bethlehem.

History
A post office called Simcoe was established in 1893, and remained in operation until 1909. According to tradition, the community took its name from a local cooperative of the same name.

References

Unincorporated communities in McDonald County, Missouri
Unincorporated communities in Missouri